Thacholi Ambu is a 1978 Indian Malayalam-language historical drama film directed and produced by Navodaya Appachan under Navodaya Studio. It was the first anamorphic CinemaScope film in Malayalam. Starring Prem Nazir in the title role, Sivaji Ganesan, Ravikumar and Jayan.

Plot 
Thacholi Ambu's (Prem Nazir) uncle, the great warrior Thacholi Othenan speaks to him through an oracle to go to Ponniyam Parunthunkalkotta. Ambu befriends the poor ferryman Mayan Kutty and his grandson Kunjali and learns that Parunthunkalkotta Panicker had murdered his uncle and implicated Mayan Kutty's son Bappu(Jayan) as the assassin. Bappu and his family flees from the bloodthirsty mob. But as he saves his eldest son from a crocodile, the mob catches up with Bappu and kills him. The child is lost and the bereaved Mayan Kutty manages to pack the rest of the family to a safe shore.

Thacholi Ambu learns that he can't conquer the fort unless he recovers the magic amulet which his uncle Thacholi Othenan had left with his wife Kunjitheyi, the sister of Parunthunkalkotta Panicker. He disguises himself and makes his way to the Fort to participate in a Grand Festival along with Mayan Kutty and Kunjali. There he meets his aunt Kunjitheyi and cousin Kanni(Unnimary) with whom he promptly falls in love.

Meanwhile Mayan Kutty is stuck by how much Kutty (Jayan), the army chief and younger son of Parunthunkalkotta Panicker resembles his own dead son Bappu. In fact Kutty is Bappu's lost eldest son. By the time the truth is known Kutty had already declared a duel with Kunjali, his biological brother who had threatened his villainous adoptive elder brother Ithiri. Kutty is torn between his loyalty to his adoptive family and his biological family who have truth on their side. Ambu makes his way to the fort to save Kunjali from the duel.Kutty makes sure that the magical amulet reaches his aunt who will restore it to the rightful owner, Thacholi Ambu. A furious Mayan Kutty shoots Parunthunkalkotta Panicker with the same gun with which he had murdered Thacholi Othenan all those years ago.

Cast 
 Prem Nazir as Thacholi Ambu, Othenan's Nephew
 Sivaji Ganesan as Thacholi Othenakkurup
 Jayan as Bappu and Kutty (Bappu's Son)
 K. P. Ummer as Kathiroor Gurukkal
 Balan K. Nair as Mayan Kutty, Bappu's Father
 N. Govindan Kutty as Parunthunkalkotta Panicker, Othenan's Brother-in-law
 M. N. Nambiar as Ittiri, Parunthunkalkotta Panicker's eldest Son
 G. K. Pillai as Payyampalli Chanthu, Othenan's Friend
Ravikumar as Kunjali, Bappu's other Son
 K. R. Vijaya as Kunjitheyi, Othenan's Wife
 Unnimary as Kanni, Othenan's Daughter
 Vijaya Lalitha
 Alummoodan
 Usilai Mani
 Ushakumari
 Meena as Ambu's mother and Othenan's sister

Production 
Thacholi Ambu is the first Malayalam film in CinemaScope. Sivaji Ganesan ventured to enact the film's action scenes without the use of a stunt double. During the filming of one such scene, he fell from a height of six feet. A shield fell on his hand and injured him severely, resulting in him being hospitalised for many days.

Soundtrack 
The music was composed by K. Raghavan and the lyrics were written by Yusufali Kechery.

Box office 
The film performed well at the box office. Made on a cost of ₹30 lakh (₹3 million), the film grossed more than ₹1 crore (₹10 million) at the box office.

References

External links 
 Thacholi Ambu at the Malayalam Movie Database
 

1978 films
1970s Malayalam-language films
Films directed by Navodaya Appachan